Arden-Arcade is a census-designated place (CDP) in Sacramento County, California, United States. The population was 92,186 at the 2010 census, making it the second most populous census-designated place in California. It is east of the city of Sacramento and west of the community of Carmichael.

Arden-Arcade is a principal locality of the Sacramento–Arden-Arcade–Roseville Metropolitan Statistical Area.

History
The history of the community of Arden-Arcade is documented in the "Sacramento ALC Historical Study 82," Rancho Del Paso, Office of History, Sacramento Air Logistics Center, McClellan Air Force Base, California, March 1983, by Raymond Oliver. The first residents of what would become the Arden-Arcade area were the Nisenan, an indigenous people of the horizon period with their own language, culture, and social order. 

The land was originally part of a Mexican land grant deeded to John Sutter, the Rancho del Paso grant was negotiated from the Mexican governor by Sutter. On August 10, 1843 Sutter then deeded the Rancho Del Paso to Eliab and Hiram Grimes and John Sinclair. Samuel Norris was the next owner of Rancho del Paso, then James Haggin. From 1862 to 1905, James Ben Ali Haggin owned the Rancho, where he became known for breeding race horses. One of the horses bred on the Rancho, Ben Ali, won the 12th Kentucky Derby in world record time 1886. To ship his horses, Haggin built a railroad spur from his northern paddocks (approximately where today's Hagginwood Golf Course is) toward the current Union Pacific railroad tracks, northeast of the present-day Capitol City Freeway along the beginnings of Arcade Boulevard. On that site, Haggin's staff built 24 barns with 64 stalls each plus some out buildings. It was there that he would ship his horses mostly to Kentucky, some eventually shipping around the world.

“Arden" most likely comes from the fact that Orlando Robertson, the owner of the Rancho and a developer after Haggin, was originally from Arden Hills, Minnesota. As for “Arcade,” Haggin had located the headquarters alongside the major creek that ran through the Rancho (now off Arcade Boulevard, in the South Hagginwood neighborhood of Northern Sacramento), the place name for which being designated "Arcade," after the "arcade" of the limbs to a string of shade-giving native oak trees there. The remnants of the majestic trees can still be seen though some are dead stumps. (In architecture, an arcade is a number of arches supporting a wall.) 

Orlando Robertson was a land speculator who came to Sacramento after he heard about the exceptional lands of the Rancho Del Paso. He bought the Rancho in 1905 for $1.5 million for his Sacramento Colonization Company and laid out the streets and developed the tracts for sale. Robertson chose street names that reflected the inventors of the period: Watt, Edison, Howe, Bell and so on. 

By 1916, given the fertile soil and excellent supply of water, Robertson sold the tracts to farming families, many of them Scandinavian immigrants newly off the boat Scandinavian. In fact, the area around Gibbons Park was known as “Little Norway” because so many Norwegian families settled there. Arden-Arcade and neighboring Carmichael were advertised as excellent areas for growing citrus, but olives, nuts and stone fruit were also farmed here. At one time, Arden-Arcade was the hop-growing region of the world.

Among the oldest surviving buildings in the area are the Arden Middle School, built in 1914, and the Del Paso Country Club, from 1919, named for the original Rancho on which it was built. The first residential neighborhoods in the area were constructed in the 1920s and the 1930s, as the city developed over the river, but the real building boom came at the end of World War II.

However, the real current face of Arden-Arcade was built between 1945 and 1970 and remains a fine representation of a middle-class mid-century modern community, with home developments by John Davis, Jere Strizek, and Randolph Parks. There are also large custom-built developments dotted with homes and office complexes built by Carter Sparks, the Streng Brothers and John Harvey Carter. Arden-Arcade features multiple googie architectural structures as well.

Geography
Arden-Arcade is located at  (38.605154, -121.379750).

Boundaries
Arden-Arcade's northern border is formed by Auburn Boulevard and Arcade Creek, its southern border is primarily the American River, its western border is Ethan Way and its eastern border is formed by Walnut Avenue, Cypress Avenue, and Mission Avenue.

Community

Transportation
Arden-Arcade is served by three major highways. Interstate 80 and the Capital City Freeway are just north of the community and just to the south of the American River (the community's southern border) is U.S. Route 50. Major east-west thoroughfares include El Camino Avenue, Marconi Avenue, Arden Way, Alta Arden Expressway, and Fair Oaks Boulevard. Major north-south thoroughfares include Fulton Avenue, Watt Avenue, Howe Avenue, and Eastern Avenue.

Many of the major arterial streets that criss-cross through Arden-Arcade are named for the major inventors of the Industrial Revolution. It is assumed they were named around 1915 by Orlando Robertson, the main property owner of the historic Rancho Del Paso at the time. The street names appear as the following in the archives immediately after this time:
Watt Avenue (James Watt - steam engine)
Howe Avenue (Elias Howe - sewing machine)
Whitney Avenue (Eli Whitney - cotton gin)
Edison Avenue (Thomas Edison - light bulb)
Marconi Avenue (Guglielmo Marconi - radio)
Fulton Avenue (Robert Fulton - steamboat)
Morse Avenue (Samuel Morse - telegraph)
Bell Street (Alexander Graham Bell - telephone)

Shopping
With a central location to many of the northeastern suburbs of Sacramento as well as the Sacramento region, Arden-Arcade is a major shopping and commercial area. Fair Oaks Boulevard and Fulton Avenue are the major commercial corridors for Arden-Arcade. The Pavilions Shopping Center lies at this intersection, and is anchored by a Williams-Sonoma and a Ruth's Chris Steakhouse. Loehmann's Plaza, which includes many restaurants, is also located along this corridor. Further north on Fulton Avenue near the Del Paso Country Club is Town & Country Village. The Village was the first shopping center west of the Mississippi River. Built and opened by Jere Strezik in 1949, The Village was a high-end boutique center with an old west decor. In its heyday, it held a Joseph Magnin's, smaller local boutique shops, and elegant dining. It is located at Fulton and Marconi Avenue, and today has Trader Joe's and Sprouts Farmers Market as main anchors. In 2012, an Orange County developer bought it and tore down many of the structures at the original center and built new larger stores that now house Ross and TJ Maxx.

Country Club Plaza is an indoor shopping mall located in Arden-Arcade. It is anchored by WinCo Foods. It also includes a Planet Fitness, a movie theater and a small number of shops and restaurants. The mall opened on November 19, 1958, with a Stop and Shop market, Gourmet Lane, Woolworth and a Weinstock's Lubin department store. The Weinstock's building was designed by Charles Luckman, with imported Italian marble and hardwood flooring from Kentucky. Across the street on Watt Avenue is the older Country Club Centre. It is anchored by Costco Business Center. The shopping center opened on August 21, 1952, with a JCPenney and a Lucky grocery store.

Car dealers are another major shopping attraction in the Arden-Arcade area. Despite competition from auto malls in Folsom, Roseville, and Elk Grove, Arden-Arcade has retained many high-end dealers that are unique to the Sacramento area. The epicenter of the auto business is on Fulton Avenue but some dealers have taken up shop on Auburn Boulevard so that they can be seen from the Capital City Freeway. Other dealers extend out as far west as Howe Avenue which is closer to the Arden Fair Mall. The Niello family's Niello Auto Group owns many of the car dealers in this area including Audi, BMW, Land Rover, Jaguar, Maserati, Mini, and Volkswagen. Envision Motors owns the Mercedes-Benz dealer at Howe Avenue and Alta Arden Expressway. Smart Cars are also sold on the same site. Epic Chevrolet and Cadillac operates at the corner of El Camino and Fulton Avenues. Tesla is located on Arden Way between Fulton Avenue and Howe Avenue. Mel Rapton Honda operated on Fulton Avenue south of Marconi Avenue for many decades, before relocating north to the north end of Fulton Avenue at the Capital City Freeway in Sacramento proper, where it is now known as Capital City Honda. Downtown Ford of Sacramento (formerly Harrold Ford) is located on Howe Avenue near Arden Way. Maita sells Hyundais, Nissans, Subarus, and Toyotas. Lexus of Sacramento and Sacramento Kia are also located along Fulton Avenue.

Schools
 St. Philomene Catholic School (K-8)

High schools
 Encina Preparatory High School (1958)
 Sacramento Country Day School
 Mira Loma High School (1960)
 El Camino Fundamental High School (1950)
 Rio Americano High School (1963)
 Jesuit High School (1963)

Loretto High School, which opened in 1955 and closed after the 2008–2009 school year, was located in Arden-Arcade. It is now operated as an elementary through high school run by Aspire Public Schools.

Del Paso Country Club
Del Paso Country Club is a private country club located within Arden-Arcade. The club was founded in 1916 on land sold to the early members by Orlando Robertson in 1916. He offered a low interest rate and $8000 to build their clubhouse with. Membership is by invitation. The club includes a newly renovated 18-hole golf course, a state-of-the-art fitness center and other facilities. The golf course hosted the 2015 Senior Open Golf Tournament.

Housing
Arden-Arcade is one of the most economically and ethnically diverse communities in the Sacramento region. There are neighborhoods along the American River and the American River Parkway with million-dollar homes, including Wilhaggin, Sierra Oaks, Sierra Oaks Vista, Arden Park, Arden Oaks, and areas surrounding the Del Paso Country Club. There are also amazing mid century neighborhoods that encompass the majority of Arden Arcade. Most if not all of these community neighborhoods were built immediately after World War II, some by award-winning architects and developers, Jere Strizek, Streng Brothers and Randolph Parks. Other community wide buildings of note are mid-century modern designed businesses, including the 1961 Country Club Lanes (Powers, Daley and DeRosa), Sam's Hof Brau (one of the few remaining original German Hof Brau Deli's still in operation), the AT&T building (Hertzka and Knowels architects 1963), an original IHOP restaurant building (Nims and Koch architects 1963 — now Guaribaldi's), Weinstocks Lubin (Charles Luckman 1961) at Country Club Center, Emigh Hardware, and many more. Modern Arden Arcade was completely built out between the years 1945–1965, the prime mid century period in architecture. El Camino and Watt Avenues, where these buildings reside today, were commonly referred to by the community as Downtown Arden Arcade, and in many respects, remains so even today.

A new California governor's mansion built for Ronald Reagan was in Arden-Arcade in 1984 and was sold in 2004 and is a private residence. Governors George Deukmejian, Pete Wilson, and Gray Davis each occupied the house on Lake Wilhaggin Drive in the Wilhaggin area. The house was sold in 2004 after Governor Arnold Schwarzenegger decided not to live there and instead occupied the penthouse at the Hyatt Hotel in Downtown Sacramento when he did not commute back to Brentwood, which he did most nights.

Government

Local

Incorporation plans
On November 2, 2010, area residents voted on Measure D. The measure was defeated by a margin of 76% to 24%. If approved, the area bounded by Auburn Boulevard on the north, the American River Drive, Ethan Way on the west, and Mission Avenue/Jacob Lane on the east would have become the City of Arden-Arcade.

The city would have been governed by a council-manager form of government.  Twenty-two candidates ran for the seven-member city council. If Measure D passed, seven would have become city council members and the top vote-getter would have become mayor. A city manager would have been hired by the council to implement goals, policies and ordinances approved by the city council. The defeat of Measure D rendered the results of the election a moot point.

According to the fiscal analysis  completed under the auspices of the Sacramento Local Area Formation Commission (LAFCo), the city as proposed “may be fiscally feasible” (p. 7). LAFCo assesses the feasibility of a new city according to three standards: it is likely to be feasible; it is not likely; or it may be feasible.  The financials for the proposed new city were not strong enough to warrant finding the proposed new city likely to be feasible.

The fiscal analysis includes “revenue neutrality payments” that the city must pay Sacramento County to be in compliance with California Code section 56815.  City taxpayers would be required to reimburse Sacramento County over $6 million a year, and $219 million over a 35-year period for loss of sales tax revenue.

At that point, the city would have been expected to spend $32,086,600 on general fund expenses for the city manager's office, attorney services, city clerk's office, the development office, animal control, etc. Road maintenance expenses are expected to cost $4,948,000 by year 10. The analysis does not include an assessment of capital requirements such as the cost of financing and building a city hall. According to the  salary survey released in September by the League of California Cities, salaries for city managers in the region range from $181,135 (Woodland) to $353,000 (Roseville), with most earning compensation over $200,000.

Proponents claimed that the new city would have improved services and created community pride in the City of Arden-Arcade without any new taxes.  Opponents believed that revenue assumptions were risky and, if wrong, could lead to higher taxes.

Revenues would have largely come from property taxes and sales taxes.   LAFCo's projections of property taxes are based on this assumption about area property values: “The fiscal model assumes a nominal annual property appreciation rate of 5.2% excluding the additional value from new development” (p. 45). Property sales and retail sales are closely tied to the unemployment rate, and Sacramento ranks 326 out of 372 cities according to the most recent information available from the US Bureau of Labor Statistics.

Sacramento annexation study
As of August 24, 2010, the City of Sacramento posted on their website that they have no plans to annex Arden-Arcade.. Only the Local Area Formation Commission (LAFCo) has the regulatory authority under state law to approve or disapprove of the annexation of territory by a city (Cortese-Knox-Hertzberg Act of 2000, California Government Code Section 56000). LAFCo requires cities to keep up their general plan and look at overlapping jurisdictions. In that context, the City of Sacramento has collected information about Arden-Arcade but has not taken any steps toward incorporation, the first of which would be identifying Arden-Arcade as within its sphere of influence.

Incorporation proponents have repeatedly claimed that the city could take over the area in as little as six months with no opportunity for residents to vote. The City of Sacramento's process includes a dozen steps that would conservatively take three to five years to go through the lengthy and expensive process required. The most recent piece of land to be annexed was several hundred acres of fallow agricultural land, Greenbriar. The process took four years for this small, non-controversial annexation at the request of the developer after four rounds of Environmental Impact Reviews, municipal service reviews, organization plans, finance plan, taxation agreements and more.

As the city describes on its website, residents of an area may request annexation, or the city may investigate it. "With inhabited areas, annexation must also be supported by a majority of voters within the area proposed for annexation."

If the city undertook the lengthy road toward annexation and ultimately voted to approve, it would then have to file an application with the Local Agency Formation Commission. The many factors that LAFCo considers  when reviewing applications are listed in detail on its website as are its powers and authority.. It includes the opportunity for public testimony.

The City of Sacramento's last annexation of an inhabited area, College Greens, was in the late 1950s. While it discussed interest in Arden-Arcade in the 1960s, the City of Sacramento did not initiate formal steps toward incorporation.

In its analysis of the area as part of its general plan update, city staff noted that Arden-Arcade is "mostly built out" (see Part III of the General Plan, Community Plan and Special Study Areas, Arden-Arcade Community Plan, p. 3-AA-5 at http://www.sacgp.org/). The city has also noted that the area has significant infrastructure needs and the likelihood of community opposition to incorporation.

Arden-Arcade Community Planning Council
The Arden-Arcade Community Planning Council is a nine-member council that helps make decisions for the community of Arden-Arcade. These nine members are appointed by the Sacramento County Board of Supervisors.

Chamber of Commerce 
The North Sacramento Chamber of Commerce, Greater Arden Chamber of Commerce, and Metro Chamber Arden Arcade Council all serve the business community of Arden-Arcade.

State and federal

In the United States House of Representatives, Arden-Arcade is split between the 6th and 7th congressional districts.

Demographics

2010
The 2010 United States Census reported that Arden-Arcade had a population of 92,186. The racial makeup of Arden-Arcade was 64,688 (70.2%) White, 8,977 (9.7%) African American, 948 (1.0%) Native American, 5,152 (5.6%) Asian (1.3% Indonesian, 1.0% Chinese, 0.6% Taiwanese, 0.5% Japanese, 0.5% Korean, 0.4% Hmong, 1.3% Other), 531 (0.6%) Pacific Islander, 7,420 (8.0%) from other races, and 5,470 (5.9%) from two or more races. Hispanic or Latino of any race were 17,147 persons (18.6%).

The Census reported that 90,936 people (98.6% of the population) lived in households, 530 (0.6%) lived in non-institutionalized group quarters, and 720 (0.8%) were institutionalized.

There were 40,518 households, out of which 10,799 (26.7%) had children under the age of 18 living in them, 14,307 (35.3%) were opposite-sex married couples living together, 5,500 (13.6%) had a female householder with no husband present, 2,154 (5.3%) had a male householder with no wife present.  There were 2,859 (7.1%) unmarried opposite-sex partnerships, and 395 (1.0%) same-sex married couples or partnerships. 14,575 households (36.0%) were made up of individuals, and 4,962 (12.2%) had someone living alone who was 65 years of age or older. The average household size was 2.24.  There were 21,961 families (54.2% of all households); the average family size was 2.95.

The population was spread out, with 19,288 people (20.9%) under the age of 18, 9,419 people (10.2%) aged 18 to 24, 24,240 people (26.3%) aged 25 to 44, 24,798 people (26.9%) aged 45 to 64, and 14,441 people (15.7%) who were 65 years of age or older.  The median age was 39.0 years. For every 100 females, there were 90.1 males.  For every 100 females age 18 and over, there were 86.9 males.

The homeowner vacancy rate was 2.4%; the rental vacancy rate was 11.7%.  42,822 people (46.5% of the population) lived in owner-occupied housing units and 48,114 people (52.2%) lived in rental housing units

2000

As of the census of 2000, there were 96,025 people, 42,987 households, and 23,427 families residing in the CDP. The racial makeup of the CDP was 74,285 (77.4%) White, 5,779 (6.0%) African American, 920 (1.0%) Native American, 4664 (4.9%) Asian, 411 (0.4%) Pacific Islander, 4,972 (5.2%) from other races, and 4,994 (5.2%) from two or more races. Hispanic or Latino of any race were 11,501 (12.0%) of the population.

There were 42,987 households, out of which 24.5% had children under the age of 18 living with them, 37.8% were married couples living together, 12.4% had a female householder with no husband present, and 45.5% were non-families. 36.3% of all households were made up of individuals, and 11.2% had someone living alone who was 65 years of age or older.  The average household size was 2.19 and the average family size was 2.88.

In the CDP, the population was spread out, with 21.4% under the age of 18, 10.5% from 18 to 24, 29.0% from 25 to 44, 22.5% from 45 to 64, and 16.6% who were 65 years of age or older.  The median age was 38 years. For every 100 females, there were 90.2 males.  For every 100 females age 18 and over, there were 86.7 males.

The median income for a household in the CDP was $40,335, and the median income for a family was $51,152. Males had a median income of $38,935 versus $31,743 for females. The per capita income for the CDP was $26,530.  About 9.9% of families and 13.7% of the population were below the poverty line, including 20.2% of those under age 18 and 4.9% of those age 65 or over.

Adjacent areas

References

External links
Cityhood & Incorporation Web Site
Stay Sacramento Website
Candidates for City Council 2010
 City of Sacramento website | Community Development Department - City of Sacramento has no plans to annex Arden-Arcade
LAFCo Expert Analysis Shows NO NEW TAXES NEEDED for Arden-Arcade Incorporation
LAFCo Analysis Shows Taxes Must Go Up if Arden-Arcade Becomes Part of the City of Sacramento

Census-designated places in Sacramento County, California
Census-designated places in California